Excavata is a major supergroup of unicellular organisms belonging to the domain Eukaryota. It was first suggested by Simpson and Patterson in 1999 and introduced by Thomas Cavalier-Smith in 2002 as a formal taxon. It contains a variety of free-living and symbiotic forms, and also includes some important parasites of humans, including Giardia and Trichomonas. Excavates were formerly considered to be included in the now obsolete Protista kingdom. They are classified based on their flagellar structures, and they are considered to be the most basal flagellate lineage. Phylogenomic analyses split the members of Excavata into three different and not all closely related groups: Discobids, Metamonads and Malawimonads. Except for Euglenozoa, they are all non-photosynthetic.

Characteristics

Most excavates are unicellular, heterotrophic flagellates. Only the Euglenozoa are photosynthetic. In some (particularly anaerobic intestinal parasites), the mitochondria have been greatly reduced. Some excavates lack "classical" mitochondria, and are called "amitochondriate", although most retain a mitochondrial organelle in greatly modified form (e.g. a hydrogenosome or mitosome). Among those with mitochondria, the mitochondrial cristae may be tubular, discoidal, or in some cases, laminar. Most excavates have two, four, or more flagella. Many have a conspicuous ventral feeding groove with a characteristic ultrastructure, supported by microtubules—the "excavated" appearance of this groove giving the organisms their name. However, various groups that lack these traits may be considered excavates based on genetic evidence (primarily phylogenetic trees of molecular sequences).

The Acrasidae slime molds are the only excavates to exhibit limited multicellularity. Like other cellular slime molds, they live most of their life as single cells, but will sometimes assemble into larger clusters.

Classification

Excavates are classified into six major subdivisions at the phylum/class level. These are shown in the table below. An additional group, Malawimonadida (e.g. Malawimonas), may also be included amongst excavates, though phylogenetic evidence is equivocal.

Discoba or JEH clade
Euglenozoa and Heterolobosea (Percolozoa) or Eozoa (Cavalier-Smith) appear to be particularly close relatives, and are united by the presence of discoid cristae within the mitochondria (Superphylum Discicristata). A close relationship has been shown between Discicristata and Jakobida, the latter having tubular cristae like most other protists, and hence were united under the taxon name Discoba, which was proposed for this apparently monophyletic group.

Metamonads
Metamonads are unusual in having lost classical mitochondria—instead they have hydrogenosomes, mitosomes or uncharacterised organelles. The oxymonad Monocercomonoides is reported to have completely lost homologous organelles.

Monophyly
Excavate relationships are still uncertain; it is possible that they are not a monophyletic group. The monophyly of the excavates is far from clear, although there seem to be several clades within the excavates that are monophyletic.

Certain excavates are often considered among the most primitive eukaryotes, based partly on their placement in many evolutionary trees. This could encourage proposals that excavates are a paraphyletic grade that includes the ancestors of other living eukaryotes. However, the placement of certain excavates as 'early branches' may be an analysis artifact caused by long branch attraction, as has been seen with some other groups, for example, microsporidia. The malawimonads often do not branch with the other Excavata.

Malawimonads
The malawimonads are generally considered to be members of Excavata owing to their typical excavate morphology, and phylogenetic affinity to other excavate groups in some molecular phylogenies. However, their position among eukaryotes remains elusive.

Ancyromonads
Ancyromonads are small free-living cells with a narrow longitudinal groove down one side of the cell.  The ancyromonad groove is not used for "suspension feeding", unlike in "typical excavates" (e.g. malawimonads, jakobids, Trimastix, Carpediemonas, Kiperferlia, etc).  Ancyromonads instead capture prokaryotes attached to surfaces. The phylogenetic placement of ancyromonads is poorly understood (in 2020), however some phylogenetic analyses place them as close relatives of malawimonads. Consequently, it is possible that ancyromonads are relevant for understand the evolution of 'true' excavates.

Cladograms
This proposed cladogram for the positioning of the Excavata, with the Eukaryote root in the excavates, mainly follows Cavalier-Smith.

This perspective treats the Excavata as polyphyletic, and some, including Cavalier Smith,  argue that it should be abandoned. In an alternative view, the Discoba are sister to the rest of the Diphoda.

Gallery

References

External links 
 Open Tree of Life
 Taxonomicon
 Tree of Life Eukaryotes
 Tree of Life: Jakobida
 Tree of Life: Fornicata

 
Infrakingdoms
Taxa named by Thomas Cavalier-Smith
2002 introductions